A special election was held in  on August 25, 1800 and October 20, 1800 to fill a vacancy left by the resignation of Samuel Sewall (F).

Election results
Massachusetts electoral law required a majority for election, which was not met on the first election, necessitating a second election.

Read took his seat on November 25, 1800

See also
List of special elections to the United States House of Representatives

References

United States House of Representatives 1800 10
Massachusetts 10
Massachusetts 1800 10
1800 10
Massachusetts 10
United States House of Representatives 10